The 2014 Napa Valley Challenger was a professional tennis tournament played on hard courts. It was the second edition of the tournament which was part of the 2014 ATP Challenger Tour. It took place in Napa, California, United States, between 22 and 28 September 2014.

Singles main-draw entrants

Seeds

 1 Rankings are as of September 15, 2014.

Other entrants
The following players received wildcards into the singles main draw:
  Sam Querrey
  Marcos Giron
  Dennis Novikov
  Matt Seeberger

The following players received entry from the qualifying draw:
  Nils Langer
  Julian Lenz
  Daniel Nguyen
  Frederik Nielsen

Champions

Singles

  Sam Querrey def.  Tim Smyczek, 6–3, 6–1

Doubles

  Peter Polansky /  Adil Shamasdin def.  Bradley Klahn /  Tim Smyczek, 7–6(7–0), 6–1

External links
 Official website

Napa Valley Challenger
Napa Valley Challenger
2014 in sports in California
2014 in American tennis